The International Conference on Document Analysis and Recognition (ICDAR) is an international academic conference which is held every two years in a different city. It is about character and symbol recognition, printed/handwritten text recognition, graphics analysis and recognition, document analysis, document understanding, historical documents and digital libraries, document based forensics, camera and video based scene text analysis.

History 
ICDAR is held every second year since 1991. The host country changes every time and the conference has taken place on four different continents so far:

See also 
 International Association for Pattern Recognition

References 

Computer science conferences